National Taichung University of Science and Technology  (NTCUST) is a technical vocational university located in North District, Taichung, Taiwan. In Taiwan it is also known as 台中科大. The university began as two separate universities, National Taichung Institute of Technology (國立台中技術學院) and National Taichung Nursing College (國立台中護理專科學校).  The two schools merged on December 1, 2011 to form National Taichung University of Science and Technology.  The San-min campus is located on Sanmin Rd. near Yizhong Street shopping area, while the Min-sheng campus, where the College of Health is located, is down the same road near Taichung Hospital. The academic division of the university is composed of five colleges and one committee.

History

National Taichung Institute of Technology

National Taichung Institute of Technology (NTIT) was founded as "Taichung Public School of Commerce in Taiwan" in 1919, while Taiwan was under Japanese rule.  During this period the school went through a lot of development; new buildings were constructed and focus was placed on developing business professionals at the school.  After the end of Japanese rule, the school was changed to a provincial vocational high school in commerce in 1945.  In 1963, the school was upgraded to a junior college.  In 1999, the school became National Taichung Institute of Technology (NTIT) and began to award undergraduate degrees to students, with master's degrees beginning in 2003 and more recently, after merging with National Taichung Nursing College in December 2011, the school became a comprehensive public university in science and technology.

National Taichung Nursing College

National Taichung Nursing College was founded in 1955 as Taiwan Provincial Senior Nursing College, with a 3-year nursing program.  In 1997 the college acquired 8 hectares of land in Nantun District.  In 2002, the college was named National Taichung Nursing College.  After the merging with National Taichung Institute of Technology, the nursing college became known as National Taichung University of Science and Technology Minsheng Campus.

National Taichung University of Science and Technology 

With the approval of The Executive Yuan, NTIT merged with the National Taichung Nursing College and assumed the name of the National Taichung University of Science and Technology (NTCUST) on December 1, 2011.   With the inauguration ceremony taking place on December 19, 2011.   After the merger, NTCUST will begin its next phase of growth. Starting from 2013, NTCUST will enter the second stage of its four-year university development planning. The university will actively focus on advancing its faculty research performances, facility renovation, moreover expanding its industrial-academic cooperation and international academic partnerships.

Campus 

The university consists of 2 campuses: the San-min Campus and the Ming-sheng Campus; the two are about a 10-minute drive apart from each other. The College of Health is located at the Min-sheng Campus while the other four colleges are located in the San-min Campus.  The on-campus dormitories are divided by gender, with a total capacity of 1,382 students.

Library 

Library facilities are located in the newly built Zhong Shang Building (中商大樓).  The library currently houses: 279,030 Chinese publications, 49,030 Western language publications, 638,052 electronic publications, 13,562 audio/visual publications, 1,942 current periodicals & newspapers, and 17,415 bound periodicals.

Academics 

The university consists of 5 colleges and 1 committee: College of Business, College of Design, College of Languages and Language Applications, College of Information and Distribution Science, College of Health, and Holistic Education Committee. There are 20 undergraduate programs and 11 masters programs with an enrollment of almost 16,000 students.  The university has 986 full-time and adjunct faculty, among whom 55 are full-time professors and 145 are full-time associate professors. The average student-faculty ratio is 24 to 1. NTCUST has more than 170,000 alumni from all of the academic units, with many well known business and industry professionals in Taiwan.

Student life 

There are 13 Student Councils organized by students of different Departments, as well as 44 student clubs from different interests including academic, art and skills, community service, and sports.

International Collaboration 

NTCUST has established academic relationships with many universities and academic institutions around the world. Every year, NTCUST has sent students who receive grants from the Taiwan Ministry of Education to sister universities for exchange studies or short-term study-abroad programs.

 - Hebei University, Jimei University, Xiamen University of Technology, Zhangzhou City University, XiaMen HuaXia, Vocational College, Fudan University, Xiamen University, Fuzhou University Zhicheng College, Xiamen City University, Soochow University, Beijing Vocational College of Finance and Commerce, Jiangsu Normal University, Shandong Normal University, Quanzhou Normal University, Capital University of Economics and Business

 - Tay Do University, Ton Duc Thang University, Vietnam National University Ho Chi Minh City, Vietnamese-German University, College of Foreign Economic Relations

 - Oasis College

 - Yasuda Women's University, Osaka University of Economics, Osaka Sangyo University, Meijo University, Sapporo University, Fukui Prefectural University

 - Chonbuk National University, Chonnam National University

 - University of Victoria

 - Owens Community College, Virginia Community College System, Oral Roberts University, University of Central Oklahoma, University Language Institute of Tulsa, Florida International University, Texas Tech University, University of Michigan-Flint

 - De Montfort University

 - HTMi Hotel and Tourism Management Institute Switzerland

Photo Gallery

Notable alumni
 Chen Mao-nan, member of Legislative Yuan (2002–2005)
 Van Fan, Taiwanese actor and singer

See also
 List of universities in Taiwan

References

External links 

 National Taichung University of Science and Technology

 
Educational institutions established in 1919
1919 establishments in Taiwan
Scientific organizations based in Taiwan
Universities and colleges in Taiwan
Universities and colleges in Taichung
Technical universities and colleges in Taiwan